Space Chase USA (also known as Space Chase U.S.A. (2019), Spacetown USA, and Spacetown U.S.A.) is a 2019 American PBS documentary television film that was released on July 1, 2019. The documentary film examines the Apollo human spaceflight program, one of the greatest ventures of humankind, and its effects on Cocoa Beach, a very small Florida town, during the 1950s and the 1960s. The history of the area is especially notable due to the collective memories of its citizens. The many launch experiences at the beach were closely witnessed by members of the community. These members helped build the U.S. space program, and the influence of the nascent space program on community members can still be seen today. The film documentary features accounts by community residents, archival footage and home movies.

Participants
The documentary film includes the following participants (alphabetized by last name):

 Lee Barnhart
 Walter Cunningham
 Bonnie King
 Jerry L. Ross
 Lee Solid
 Jennifer Sugarman
 Roy Tharpe
 Al Worden

See also

 Earth phase

References

External links
  at the PBS WebSite
 
 

2019 American television episodes
2019 television films
2019 films
2019 documentary films
American documentary television films
PBS original programming
2010s American films